The Mittelhessen-Express is a train service operated by DB Regio AG in the German state of Hesse on the Main-Weser Railway and the Dill Railway, which was put into operation at the commencement of the 2007 timetable on 10 December 2006.

After a re-tender of operations for twelve years, operations of the services from 11 December 2011 were taken over by the DB Regio Hessen GmbH, a newly formed wholly owned subsidiary of DB Regio. The operation of Bombardier Talent 2 electric multiple units were intended to be used from the beginning of the contract, but were delayed by problems in obtaining certification for their operation from the Federal Railway Authority as on other routes.

Route

The Mittelhessen-Express runs on the Treysa–Giessen–Frankfurt (RB41) and Dillenburg–Giessen–Frankfurt (RB 40) routes. Trains coming from Treysa and Dillenburg are normally coupled together in Giessen and run together for the rest of the route. In the opposite direction the trains are uncoupled at Giessen. On Sundays and on Saturday afternoons and evenings trains are not coupled or uncoupled. On the common section the Mittelhessen-Express stops only at the stations of Frankfurt West, Friedberg, Bad Nauheim and Butzbach. Since the beginning of the 2010 timetable, the Mittelhessen-Express has stopped every two hours in Bad Vilbel and at stops that were previously served only by Regionalbahn trains between Giessen and Friedberg.

Rolling stock

The two sections of the Mittelhessen-Express consist of class 425 electric multiple units. During peak hour two (three between Giessen and Frankfurt) units are coupled together. Some trains are also operated by the shorter class 426 sets either individually or together with class 425 sets.

Some of the vehicles were previously used on the Kassel–Eichenberg–Göttingen and Bebra–Eichenberg–Göttingen lines, where the services were operated by Cantus Verkehrsgesellschaft. Other vehicles were acquired from Bavaria. They were rebranded as Mittelhessen-Express for the new service.

Hoists are available near the cabs for the loading of passengers’ wheelchairs.

Operations
The Mittelhessen-Express runs every hour during the week, but from Saturday afternoon it runs every two hours. Trains on Saturday evening and on Sunday run every two hours alternately via Marburg to Treysa or via Wetzlar to Dillenburg. Trains stops in Giessen for between three and seven minutes (depending on destination and direction) for coupling/uncoupling operations. In Treysa it is possible to continue towards Kassel with a change to the next Regional-Express or Intercity service. The wait is 11 minutes for the Regional-Express services, while the wait for an Intercity service has risen from the original 4 to 34 minutes. A wait for the next RegioTram Kassel service of 23 or 31 minutes is rather unattractive. In Dillenburg it is possible to continue on an RE towards Siegen after a 15 minutes wait. The Mittelhessen-Express concept was originally intended to provide for connections to Regionalbahn services, but these are narrowly missed under the current implementation.

See also
 List of rail services of the Rhein-Main-Verkehrsverbund

Rail services in Hesse